Roger Dewint (18 April 1942 – 15 April 2021) was a Belgian engraver and painter. He was an honorary professor at the Académie Royale des Beaux-Arts.

Biography
Dewint studied drawing at the Académie Royale des Beaux-Arts. He then discovered engraving at the Académie de Watermael-Boitsfort, where he met fellow painter Roger Somville, with whom he practiced monumental painting.

Dewint's works emphasized the importance of color. His specialty was acquired in his youth with his entrepreneurial father, who decorated works for clients. In his engravings, he inked each plate with all colors used in a single attempt, giving each work individuality.

Dewint held more than 80 personal exhibitions and participated in art festivals. He also illustrated many books by authors such as Philippe Roberts-Jones, Jacques Vaché, Georg Trakl, Michel Butor, Julien Gracq, and Laurent Berger.

In addition to engraving, Dewint painted watercolor envelopes, known as mail art. These envelopes have been exhibited both in Belgium and abroad.

Roger Dewint died in Uccle on 15 April 2021, three days shy of his 79th birthday.

Public collections

Belgium
Royal Museums of Fine Arts of Belgium
Museum of Ixelles
Musée L
Musée royal de Mariemont

Egypt
Library of Alexandria

United States
Museum of Modern Art
Art Institute of Chicago
San Francisco Museum of Modern Art
Portland Art Museum
Metropolitan Museum of Art
California College of the Arts
Smithsonian Institution
Joe Shoong
Philip Morris International

France
Bibliothèque nationale de France
Bibliothèque Kandinsky

Italy
Museo Civico Ala Ponzone, Cremona

Japan
Kyoto University of the Arts
Machida City Museum of Graphic Arts

Malaysia
Penang State Museum and Art Gallery

Peru
Pontifical Catholic University of Peru

Poland
Museum of Art in Łódź

Macedonia
Contemporary Art Museum of Macedonia

References

1942 births
2021 deaths
Belgian artists
Academic staff of the Académie Royale des Beaux-Arts
People from Uccle